Steven Paul Whitsitt (born 1960) is an American portrait, architecture, and fashion photographer. He was Michael Jackson’s personal photographer from 1994 to 1996, during the HIStory period

Early life 
Born in Port Huron, Michigan. on October 25th, 1960,  Steven Paul Whitsitt is the third of four children of Sally Rae Whitsitt (Hocket) and Paul Arthur Whitsitt. He enlisted in the US Navy in April of 1981 and was stationed in Ventura County, California with the United States Naval Construction Battalions, better known as the Seabees. His interest in photography started in the military, picking it up as a hobby before receiving an honorable discharge in April 1986. After his military discharge, he attended The Brooks Institute of Photography in Santa Barbara, California, and graduated in June of 1990 with a BA in Photographic Illustration

Career

Michael Jackson 
While working as an assistant in Los Angeles in 1993, another assistant contacted him, requesting he cover for a job they couldn't attend. That job was to assist Michael Jackson’s official photographer at the time, Sam Emerson, during the  “Black or White” video. He remained as the photographer's assistant for 3 years, while simultaneously working as a freelance photographer. While working for Jackson, he went to Neverland Ranch, attended Michael Jackson’s appearance at the 1993 Super Bowl halftime show, worked on Jackson’s music videos, and assisted on the Dangerous World Tour.

After returning from the tour, Sam Emerson was let go, and he was offered the opportunity to become the head photographer based on the results from a test shoot in New York City. The shoot involved Jackson wearing a military uniform and tassels on his shoulders. Jackson was pleased with the results and hired him as the official photographer.

He was the official photographer while Jackson was recording his HIStory album,  shooting stills and single covers for the songs “Smile,” “Scream,” and “You Are Not Alone.” He also covered  Jackson’s philanthropy work with hospital visits and with the Heal the World Foundation.

His photos were featured in the gallery at Kingvention 2016,  a yearly Michael Jackson fan celebration convention in London. He was an on-stage guest speaker at Kingvention 2017 with Pez Jax, founder of Kingvention.

Charlie Chaplin and the "Smile" single album cover 
Jackson always had an affinity toward Charlie Chaplin, and especially his film "The Kid." In 1994, Michael wanted to shoot a single cover for the song “Smile” in the same style as a scene from the movie where Charlie Chaplin's character sits on a stoop with Jackie Coogan in a publicity photo. He helped produce the shoot and took the photo used on the album cover. He also shot several close-up portrait shots of Michael while Michael was in the Charlie Chaplin costume. These photos, along with other photos he took, would later be featured in the official Michael Jackson Opus. The Chaplin photos were also featured at the Yuz Museum Shangai's  "Charlie Chaplin. A Vision" exhibition in 2018. This is a touring collection established by the Musée de l'Élysée. His photos will become a part of the museum's permanent collection in 2020.

In 1996, he was let go during the shooting of Michael Jackson's You Are Not Alone music video, and later moved to North Carolina.

Teaching 
After moving to North Carolina, he taught photography at the Carolina Friends School in Durham, North Carolina for 5 years.

Architectural photography 
He has worked as a residential and commercial architectural photographer since 2003, and has authored/co-authored 6 books on architectural photography, all published by Schiffer Publishing Ltd.:

 Arts & Crafts Houses
 Lowcountry Plantations: Georgia & South Carolina
 Esherick, Maloof, and Nakashima: Homes of the Master Wood Artisans
 Handmade Houses
 The Kitchen Guide
 Built with Stone: Eight Contemporary Artisans

He has received 6 Houzz awards for Best of: Design and Best of: Service from 2014 to 2017.

References 

1960 births
People from Port Huron, Michigan
Brooks Institute alumni
American portrait photographers
Architectural photographers
Fashion photographers
Living people